Halil Ergin Ataman (born January 7, 1966) is a Turkish professional basketball coach. He is the current head coach of Anadolu Efes of the Turkish Basketball Super League and the EuroLeague. He also coaches the Turkey men's national basketball team.

During his playing career which began in 1982, he played at Eczacıbaşı and Yeşilyurt basketball teams.

Coaching career

Early years
Ataman began his managerial career in Eczacıbaşı Youth Team followed by a stint as the coach of Efes Pilsen Youth Team. Then, he coached the BSL teams Türk Telekom, Pınar Karşıyaka and Efes Pilsen respectively. He was the assistant coach of Turkish national team alongside Ercüment Sunter in EuroBasket 1997 in Spain. Turkey finished the tournament in the 8th place. He spent time at Stanford University in the United States as an observer during the 1998-99 season.

After his return to Europe, he coached Italian side Montepaschi Siena and won with the club the very last Saporta Cup in 2002. Subsequently, he joined Ülkerspor (now Fenerbahçe Ülker); however, he had to quit his job due to personal issues. He stated that his resignation was voluntary. Subsequent to his departure from Fenerbahçe he returned to Italy and signed for Climamio Bologna and coached there until his return to Turkey as the head coach of Beşiktaş during the 2007–08 season.

Beşiktaş Cola Turka
Ataman had a successful season with Beşiktaş which the team achieved EuroCup Quarter Finals held in Turin, Italy; after a stunning undefeated 10 in-a-row win performance in group B. This was the very first time that two Turkish teams played against each other. Beşiktaş lost against Galatasaray Cafe Crown and eliminated in quarters. In the league, team finalized the regular season on top place and been a part of Play-offs. After the elimination of Beşiktaş Cola Turka in the quarters, the declaration was released that Ergin Ataman no more coaching Beşiktaş Cola Turka.

Efes Pilsen
A week later, he signed a two-years contract with Efes Pilsen, where he had worked from 1999 to 2001. Ataman have reached the major achievements in 2008–09 season with winning Turkish League, Turkish Cup, and Turkish President's Cup championships. On June 4, 2010, he left the Efes Pilsen.

Return to Beşiktaş
He signed a two-years contract with Beşiktaş in the January 2011. In the 2010–11 season, he didn't win the cups with Beşiktaş. And next season, he won the Turkish Cup in February 2012. Subsequently, he won the EuroChallenge title against Elan Chalon in the final on April 29, 2012. And finally, he won the Turkish League championship victory against Anadolu Efes in the playoff finals on June 11, 2012.

Galatasaray Odeabank
He signed a multi-year contract with Galatasaray Odeabank on June 22, 2012. He won the Turkish League championship victory against Banvitspor in the playoff finals on June 15, 2013.

In the beginning of 2014–15 season, Galatasaray struggled financially and eventually in the results. Several players boycotted training and also some were injured, which led to frustration and conflicts in the team. On October 19, 2014, Ataman was involved in the incident with then-Galatasaray player Nolan Smith, who threw the towel while being subbed out from the game against Banvit. The player parted ways with the team the following week. On November 21, 2014, in the press-conference after the EuroLeague game against the Serbian team Crvena zvezda in Istanbul, Ataman got negative publicity in Serbia, for calling 300–400 Zvezda fans Delije the "terrorists". He also stated that they were "attacking our police and our fans with torches and stones" and that he was "worried as a citizen for his and others safety". All these comments came in line with the killing of Crvena zvezda fan by Galatasaray supporters in fan violence before the game. Even Serbian PM Aleksandar Vučić reacted to that comment, saying that "Ataman is no longer welcome in Serbia". Ataman later apologized for his comments, saying that "all the remarks [on Zvezda fans] were made before learning it [that this tragedy occurred before the game]".

On June 6, 2015, he signed a two-year extension with the club, reportedly worth half million euros per season.

On April 27, Ataman's team Galatasaray Odebank defeated Strasbourg in Abdi İpekçi Arena and won the EuroCup title. With this win he reached his 3rd European-wide championship as a head coach.

Anadolu Efes
In December 2017, Ataman signed a contract with Anadolu Efes.

In 2018–19 season, Ataman led Anadolu Efes to the 2019 EuroLeague Final Four, where they lost in the final game to the CSKA Moscow. On May 23, Ataman signed a two-year contract extension with the Anadolu Efes.

In 2020–21 season, Ataman won the EuroLeague title where they played with Barcelona in the final game. Ataman became the first Turkish coach who won the EuroLeague title. And next season, he won the Turkish Cup in February 2022.

He won the EuroLeague title for the second time in a row in the final match against Real Madrid in the 2021–22 season.

Coaching record

EuroLeague

|- 
| align="left"|Montepaschi
| align="left"|2002–03
| 22 || 11 || 11 ||  || align="center"|Won in 3rd place game
|- 
| align="left"|Ülker
| align="left"|2003–04
| 13 || 6 || 7 ||  || align="center"|Eliminated in Top 16 stage
|- 
| align="left"|Ülker
| align="left"|2004–05
| 22 || 10 || 12 ||  || align="center"|Eliminated in quarterfinals
|- 
| align="left"|Ülker
| align="left"|2005–06
| 19 || 6 || 13 ||  || align="center"|Eliminated in Top 16 stage
|- 
| align="left"|Bologna
| align="left"|2006–07
| 14 || 5 || 9 ||  || align="center"|Eliminated in regular season
|- 
| align="left"|Efes Pilsen
| align="left"|2008–09
| 10 || 4 || 6 ||  || align="center"|Eliminated in regular season
|- 
| align="left"|Efes Pilsen
| align="left"|2009–10
| 16 || 6 || 10 ||  || align="center"|Eliminated in Top 16 stage
|- 
| align="left"|Galatasaray
| align="left"|2013–14
| 27 || 13 || 14 ||  || align="center"|Eliminated in quarterfinals
|- 
| align="left"|Galatasaray
| align="left"|2014–15
| 24 || 6 || 18 ||  || align="center"|Eliminated in Top 16 stage
|- 
| align="left"|Galatasaray
| align="left"|2016–17
| 30 || 11 || 19 ||  || align="center"|Eliminated in regular season
|- 
| align="left"|Anadolu Efes
| align="left"|2017–18
| 18 || 4 || 14 ||  || align="center"|Eliminated in regular season
|- 
| align="left"|Anadolu Efes
| align="left"|2018–19
| 37 || 24 || 13 ||  || align="center"|Lost in the final game
|- 
| align="left"|Anadolu Efes
| align="left"|2019–20
| 28 || 24 || 4 ||  || align="center"|EuroLeague cancelled due to the COVID-19 pandemic.
|- 
|- ! style="background:#FDE910;"
| align="left"|Anadolu Efes
| align="left"|2020–21
| 41 || 27 || 14 ||  || align="center"|Won EuroLeague Championship
|- 
|- ! style="background:#FDE910;"
| align="left"|Anadolu Efes
| align="left"|2021–22
| 34 || 21|| 13 ||  || align="center"|Won EuroLeague Championship

|-class="sortbottom"
| align="center" colspan=2|Career||314||151||163||||

Domestic Leagues

|-
| align="left" |Anadolu Efes Pilsen
| align="left" |2017–18
|36||25||11||.6944 || align="center"| Lost 2018 Turkish League Semifinals
|-
| align="left" |Anadolu Efes Pilsen
| align="left" |2018–19
|40||34||6||.8500 || align="center"| Won 2019 Turkish League Finals
|-
| align="left" |Anadolu Efes Pilsen
| align="left" |2019–20
|23||21||2||.9737 || align="center"| League cancelled due to the COVID-19 pandemic.
|-
| align="left" |Anadolu Efes Pilsen
| align="left" |2020–21
|38||37||1||.9737 || align="center"| Won 2021 Turkish League Finals
|-class="sortbottom"
| align="center" colspan=2|Career||137|||117|||20||.8540||

Achievements
 Türk Telekom 1
 Turkish President's Cup: (1997)
 Montepaschi Siena 1
 Saporta Cup: (2002)
EuroLeague Final Four: (2003)
 Ülkerspor 4
 Turkish Cup:(2004, 2005)
 Turkish President's Cup: (2004, 2005)
 Anadolu Efes 14
Korać Cup (1996) Assistant Coach
EuroLeague: (2021, 2022)
EuroLeague Final Four: (2000), (2019)
Turkish Super League: (2009, 2019, 2021)
 Turkish President's Cup: (2000, 2009, 2018, 2019, 2022)
 Turkish Cup: (2009, 2018, 2022)
 Beşiktaş Milangaz 3
 Turkish Cup: (2012)
 EuroChallenge: (2012)
 Turkish Super League: (2012)
 Galatasaray Odeabank 2
 Turkish Super League: (2013)
 EuroCup: (2016)

Personal life
Ataman studied at Italian High School in Istanbul. Then he was accepted by Istanbul University, where he studied at Business Administration Department. He is married to Berna Ataman and has a son named Sarp.

See also 
 List of EuroLeague-winning head coaches

References

External links

 Ergin Ataman at euroleague.net
 

1966 births
Living people
Anadolu Efes S.K. coaches
Basketbol Süper Ligi head coaches
Beşiktaş basketball coaches
EuroLeague-winning coaches
Fortitudo Pallacanestro Bologna coaches
Galatasaray S.K. (men's basketball) coaches
Istanbul University alumni
Liceo Italiano alumni
Mens Sana Basket coaches
Basketball players from Istanbul
Turkish basketball coaches
Turkish men's basketball players
Türk Telekom basketball coaches
Turkey men's national basketball team coaches
Ülkerspor basketball coaches